The 2010 I-League U19 was the second edition of the I-League U19.

The tournament was held in May 2010 in Phagwara, Kolkata and Goa with the I-League and I-League 2nd Division youth teams and academies.

All teams played the other teams in their group once and the group winners (3 group winners) and second placed (3 second placed) played in two qualification groups. The winners qualifies for the final. The Sporting Clube de Goa won the edition of the youth league.

Group stage
The 14 participating teams were divided into three groups and played against each other. The group winner and the second placed made it to the next round. Group A was held in Goa, while Group B in Paghwara and Group C in Kolkata.

Group A 

Mahindra United
Air India
Mumbai FC
Pune FC
JCT

Group B 
Dempo
Sporting Clube de Goa
Viva Kerala
Churchill Brothers
Salgaocar

Group C 
Mohun Bagan
East Bengal
United SC
Shillong Lajong

Final round

Champions Group Stage

The group winners qualified for the final.

Finals

References

2009–10 in Indian football
I-League U19 seasons